The following is a list of awards and nominations received by American filmmaker Billy Wilder.

Wilder was an American film writer, director, producer, with a Hollywood career that spanned over five decades, and is regarded as one of the most brilliant and versatile filmmakers for Classical Hollywood cinema. His most recognized films include: the crime noir Double Indemnity (1944), the film noir The Lost Weekend (1945), the black comedy Sunset Boulevard (1950), the newspaper drama Ace in the Hole (1951), the war film Stalag 17 (1953), the romance Sabrina (1954), the comedy The Seven Year Itch (1955), the epic The Spirit of St. Louis, the romantic comedy Love in the Afternoon, and the courtroom drama Witness for the Prosecution (all 1957), as well as gender bending comedy Some Like it Hot (1959), and the romance drama The Apartment (1960).

Over his distinguished and varied career as a director he has received 21 Academy Award nominations winning six awards for The Lost Weekend, Sunset Boulevard, and The Apartment. He also earned two British Academy Film Award nominations and a win for The Apartment as well as seven Golden Globe Award nominations winning twice for The Lost Weekend and Sunset Boulevard. He has also received 5 Writers Guild of America Award wins as well as the Cannes Film Festival's prestigious Palme d'Or for The Lost Weekend in 1945 and the Venice Film Festival award for Best Director for Ace in the Hole.

He has also received various honorary awards, and tributes including the Academy of Motion Pictures Arts and Sciences' Irving G. Thalberg Memorial Award in 1987, and the BAFTA Fellowship in 1995. He has also received the Directors Guild of America Lifetime Achievement Award, the Producers Guild of America's David O. Selznick Achievement Award and two Laurel Awards for Screenwriting Achievements from the Writers Guild of America. He has also been honored with a Gala Tribute at Film at Lincoln Center (1982), the American Film Institute's Life Achievement Award (1986), Berlin International Film Festival's Honorary Golden Bear (1993), the Kennedy Center Honors (1990), and a National Endowment for the Arts (1993).

Major associations

Academy Awards

British Academy Film Awards

Golden Globe Awards

Guild awards

Directors Guild of America

Producers Guild of America

Writers Guild of America

Festival awards

Cannes Film Festival

Venice Film Festival

Critics awards 
New York Film Critics Circle Awards

Honorary awards

References 

Wilder, Billy
Wilder, Billy